The Galleria is a designer outlet centre in Hatfield, Hertfordshire, in South-east England.

History 
The Galleria was constructed in the 1991 as part of a plan to increase retail space in Hatfield. The A1(M), a bypass of the old Great North Road from London, was built as a cut-and-cover tunnel with The Galleria on top, while also intentionally making an all-glass building to celebrate the aeronautic history of Hatfield. 

It was a project of Gerald Carroll's Carroll Group and was budgeted at £50 million but cost £90 million by the time it was finished, 18 months late. Carroll refinanced the project and injected £30 million. It opened in 1991, but banker Samuel Montagu placed the scheme in receivership in 1992. Afterwards, records were found showing the purchase of bugging equipment and the employment of private detectives to watch the bankers involved.

The centre was converted to an outlet-led centre in 1996. Land Securities acquired the centre from Galleria Jersey Ltd in 2005 and took full control of the asset management of the centre in September 2006.

Features 
The centre occupies 311,000 sq ft of space. There are more than 80 retail outlets trading at The Galleria.

Location and transport links 
The centre is located 6 miles north of London's orbital motorway, the M25. It is situated on top of the Hatfield Tunnel which houses the A1(M) motorway.

The centre can be reached from Junctions 3 or 4 of the A1(M), which provides connections to the M25, or by the A414 from Hertford or St Albans. By public transport, the centre can be accessed from Hatfield railway station or St Albans City railway station. Both stations have bus links to the centre. Buses run from various places, such as Hemel Hempstead and Watford to the west, Stevenage and Welwyn Garden City to the north, Hertford to the east, and Barnet and Potters Bar in the south.

Gallery

See also 
List of shopping centres in the United Kingdom
Gunwharf Quays - another outlet centre owned by Land Securities in Portsmouth, Hampshire

References 

Outlet malls in England
Shopping centres in Hertfordshire